Lesbian, gay, bisexual, and transgender (LGBT) people in  Suriname may face legal challenges not experienced by non-LGBT residents. Both male and female same-sex sexual activity are legal in Suriname. Since 2015, hate speech and discrimination in employment and the provision of goods and services on the basis of sexual orientation has been banned in the country. Same-sex marriage and civil unions are not recognised by law. Nevertheless, Suriname is legally bound to the January 2018 Inter-American Court of Human Rights ruling, which held that same-sex marriage is a human right protected by the American Convention on Human Rights.

While homosexuality tends to be viewed as a taboo topic, the situation and attitudes have slowly changed in recent years.

Legality of same-sex sexual activity
Same-sex sexual activity has been legal in Suriname since 1869. The age of consent for heterosexual intercourse is 16, while the age of consent for homosexual intercourse is 18.

Recognition of same-sex relationships

Same-sex marriages, civil unions or domestic partnerships are not possible in Suriname.

In February 2023, the Constitutional Court ruled the ban on same-sex marriage does not violate the constitution or Suriname's obligations under the Interamerican Convention on Human Rights. However, the court also found that the Civil Code is outdated and needs to be modernized following public debate.

Discrimination protections
In March 2015, the Government introduced hate speech legislation which includes sexual orientation as a ground for non-discrimination complaints. Specifically, articles 175, 175a and 176 of the Surinamese Penal Code were updated to include sexual orientation. Violation of this law can result in a prison sentence of up to one year or a fine. In addition, articles 176c and 500a forbid discrimination based on sexual orientation in employment and the provision of goods and services. Despite the protective legislation, the LGBT community continues to face discrimination from society. In 2014, the Government explicitly excluded LGBT people from a social security legislation. According to the United States Department of State, some members of Parliament and the then-Vice President spoke out openly against LGBT persons, comparing homosexuality to a "disease" and inciting hatred and violence. Additionally, in 2015, there were reports of societal discrimination against the LGBT community in the areas of employment and housing.

Gender identity and expression
In January 2017, the Eerste Kantongerecht (one of 3 Courts of First Instance in Suriname) granted a transgender woman the right to have her gender formally changed with the Central Bureau of Civil Affairs and ordered the registry to officially change her registration to reflect her amended status. The Association of Pentecostal Churches in Suriname (VVPES) and the Suriname Islamic Association (SIV), which had protested against and opposed the right to recognize a gender change, indicated they would "accept the verdict". In February 2017, the Central Bureau of Civil Affairs formally appealed the court ruling. In January 2022, the Suriname Court of Appeal ruled in favor and ordered the gender change on the birth certificate of the transgender woman who had undergone sex reassignment surgery in 2009.

Activism
Suriname's first public gay rights march took place on 11 October 2011 (National Coming Out Day,  in Dutch) in Paramaribo, following MP Ronny Asabina's comments against homosexuality in June. Two members of the National Assembly, including Harish Monorath, attended the event. It was partly organized by Suriname Men United, the largest gay men's organization in the country.

Other LGBT groups include PAREA and the LGBT Platform Suriname. Both are active in raising awareness of LGBT people, organising seminars with the police force on recognizing anti-LGBT violence, and pressing for the legal recognition of same-sex couples.

In late 2016, Justice Minister Jennifer van Dijk-Silos organized several public hearings in collaboration with civil society in Suriname to discuss the expansion of the rights of LGBT people.

Public opinion
A 2010 opinion poll carried out by Vanderbilt University showed that 10.3% of the Surinamese population supported same-sex marriage.

In May 2015, PlanetRomeo, an LGBT social network, published its first Gay Happiness Index (GHI). Gay men from over 120 countries were asked about how they feel about society's view on homosexuality, how do they experience the way they are treated by other people and how satisfied are they with their lives. Suriname was ranked 46th with a GHI score of 48.

Summary table

See also

LGBT rights in the Americas

References